Kongsberg Miners, also known as Bergkameratene Basketball, is a professional basketball team based in Kongsberg, Norway, playing in the Norwegian premier professional men's basketball league BLNO. Kongsberg Miners is currently the most successful basketball team in Norway, winning both the regular season and the Norwegian championship in the 2018/2019 season.

History
The team made their debut in the BLNO in the 2015–16 season. In the 2016–17 season, the team finished the regular season in the first place but failed in the playoffs after being eliminated in the semifinals.

In the 2017–18 season, the Miners won the Norwegian championship by beating Asker Aliens in the finals.

In 2018, Miners made their debut in European competitions by playing the FIBA Europe Cup. They were eliminated by Ukrainian Cherkaski Mavpy in the first qualifying round. Kongsberg lost its first European game at home, 63–83, and its second 101–90, away.

In the 2018–19 season, the Miners won both the regular season and the Norwegian championship. They beat Gimle in the championship finals. Robert Hubbs III was the MVP of the championship.

European record

Notes

Current roster

Honours
BLNO
Champions (2): 2017–18, 2018–19

References

External links
 
 Eurobasket.com Team Page

Basketball teams established in 1999
Basketball teams in Norway
Kongsberg
1999 establishments in Norway